Julia du Plessis (born 27 May 1996) is a South African female professional high jumper. She is the 2015 African Games bronze medallist.

A child prodigy, her personal best jump is 1.88 metres, achieved in March 2012 in Germiston. In the age-specific categories she went on to win the bronze medal at the 2013 World Youth Championships, the silver medal at the 2015 African Junior Championships and finished twelfth at the 2012 World Junior Championships.

She won the bronze medal at the 2015 African Games, finished eighth at the 2016 African Championships, tenth at the 2017 Summer Universiade and sixth at the 2018 African Championships.

Achievements
All information taken from World Athletics profile.

National titles
 South African Championships
 High jump: 2014, 2015, 2016, 2017, 2018, 2019

  Championships
 High jump: 2015, 2016, 2017, 2018, 2019

 South African U23 Championships
 High jump: 2016

 South African Junior Championships
 High jump: 2012

 South African U18 Championships
 High jump: 2012, 2013

References

External links
 

1996 births
Living people
South African female high jumpers
Athletes (track and field) at the 2015 African Games
African Games bronze medalists for South Africa
African Games medalists in athletics (track and field)
Athletes (track and field) at the 2019 African Games
Competitors at the 2017 Summer Universiade
South African Athletics Championships winners